Jantzen is a brand of swimwear that was established in 1916 and first appeared in the city of Portland, Oregon, United States. The brand name later replaced the name of the parent company that manufactured the branded products. The brand featured a logo image of a young woman, dressed in a red one-piece swimsuit and bathing hat, assuming a diving posture with outstretched arms and an arched back. Known as the Jantzen "Diving Girl", the image in various forms became famous throughout the world during the early twentieth century.

History

Origin 
Carl C. Jantzen and brothers John A. Zehntbauer and C. Roy Zehntbauer founded the Portland Knitting Company, the predecessor of Jantzen Inc., in January 1910, in Portland, Oregon. It was a small knitting concern located in downtown Portland, and they produced sweaters, woolen hosiery and other knitted goods in the upstairs space, and sold them in the retail outlet downstairs. Carl Jantzen died from a heart attack on May 30, 1939 while passing through Sherman Hill, Idaho returning from a round-the-world tour.

Designs 
The founders were members of the Portland Rowing Club, and in 1913, the company was asked to provide a rowing suit for use in the chilly mornings on the Willamette River. The story, as told by Zehntbauer in the company paper, the Jantzen Yarns:

The one-piece garment of pure wool that Carl Jantzen designed eventually became the prototype for the rib-stitch swimsuits that were first produced in 1915.

Brand name 

Following World War I, a national advertising campaign was launched with advertisements illustrating Jantzen suits placed in Vogue and the old Life Magazine. Jantzen was a leader in promotion of its new product. The cover of the advertisements featured the "Red Diving Girl", which became adopted as the logo of the company and recognizable worldwide.

Garment description 
It was around this time that the company started to promote the idea of the swimsuit, as opposed to the bathing suit, and the tag-line "The Suit That Changed Bathing to Swimming":

Logo 
Jantzen's Diving Girl was designed by Frank and Florenz Clark. She first made her appearance in advertisements in 1920, wearing a daring red suit, stocking cap and stockings, and first appeared on Jantzen swimming suits in 1923. Over the years, the stockings and stocking cap were dropped, and in the late 1940s, the suit became strapless. The whole design was modernized again in the 1980s. The Diving Girl remains a recognized international brand and is one of the longest lived apparel icons.

Development 

During the inter-war years of the late 1920s and early 1930s the company established overseas manufacturing facilities and sales teams, notably in Europe. By 1932, Jantzen was reportedly the seventh most known trademark in the world.

In the 1940s, business perked up after Jantzen added sweaters, girdles and activewear to its basic swimwear line. The bikini was introduced in France in 1946 to set the style for brevity in swimwear and became a worldwide fashion classic.

In the 1950s, fashion designer Maurice Levin popularized the trend of the color pink worn on men through the Jantzen brand.

Throughout the 1970s and 1980s, Jantzen recognized that working women wanted attractive beachwear for weekends and vacations. In some resort areas, swim separates, cover-ups, and ankle-length beach skirts completed many swimsuit ensembles. Jantzen began to work with nylon and spandex to add stretch that holds shape. Jantzen also introduced a Trikini, combining a string bikini worn underneath a lacy, semi-transparent maillot.

Ownership and portfolio changes 
In 1980, Jantzen was purchased by Blue Bell, and Blue Bell was acquired by Vanity Fair Corporation in 1986. This acquisition was a disaster for Jantzen and led to its demise. In 1995, the company dropped the production of menswear to concentrate on women's apparel, returning to its roots in swimsuits. In 2002, the Jantzen trademark was purchased by Perry Ellis International, Inc. In 2019, Perry Ellis International, Inc. sold the Jantzen brand to Jantzen Brands Corporation.

See also 
 List of companies based in Oregon
 Jantzen Beach Amusement Park
 List of swimwear brands

References

External links 
 A Brief History of Jantzen from Jantzen.com (as archived 2011)
 Jantzen Through the Decades from Janzten.com
 Jantzen Red Diving Girl – Oregon History Project

Swimwear manufacturers
Manufacturing companies based in Portland, Oregon
Perry Ellis International brands
American companies established in 1910
1910 establishments in Oregon